A Place Among the Fallen is a novel by Adrian Cole published in 1986.

Plot summary
A Place Among the Fallen is a novel in which a quest involves going to the heart of darkness.

Reception
Dave Langford reviewed A Place Among the Fallen for White Dwarf #80, and stated that "Despite some indigestible chunks of background explanation and occasional rotten dialogue [...] it's a nicely convoluted yarn."

Reviews
Review by Chris Barker (1986) in Vector 134

References

1986 novels